Rosemont, formerly River Road, is a Chicago "L" station at the intersection of River Road and I-190 in the suburb of Rosemont, Illinois. Trains are scheduled to depart from Rosemont every 2–7 minutes during rush-hour periods, and take about 36 minutes to travel to the Loop. The station is 7 blocks east and 2 blocks north of O'Hare International Airport. Rosemont is the busiest station outside the city limits of Chicago, with 2,090,977 passenger entries in 2014.

History
It was built to a design by the architectural firm Murphy/Jahn. The station served as the temporary terminal for the West-Northwest route until the terminal at  opened a year later. Prior to the 1990s, the station was known as River Road, as the CTA did not feel that the names of stations should advertise cities outside Chicago limits.

The platform is wedge-shaped, with the width increasing from east to west, due to the Rosemont Yard sitting immediately west of the station, between the inbound and outbound tracks.

Services
Rosemont is the terminus to many Pace bus routes. In addition, there is a parking lot for commuters that costs $7 USD for 14 hours of allowed time. Due to the station's close proximity to many airport hotels, a visitors pass machine is also found in the station. Just west of the station is a maintenance facility built in a wide spot of the freeway's median. The station contains a Dunkin' Donuts doughnut stand, which was installed in September 2004.

Rosemont serves as the eastern terminus for Pace I-90 Express service. This BRT provides on-highway express service all the way to Elgin.

It is located only 1 mile from the City of Des Plaines at its westernmost border. The Rosemont station handles more suburban commuters from Des Plaines than any other suburb, including Rosemont itself.

Bus connections
Pace
 221 Wolf Road (Weekdays only)
 222 Allstate Arena Direct (Game Days and Events only)
 223 Elk Grove/Rosemont CTA Station
 230 South Des Plaines (Weekdays only)
 284 Six Flags Great America Express (Early June through Labor Day and October only)
 303 Forest Park/Rosemont (Weekdays only)
 330 Mannheim/LaGrange Roads
 332 River Road/York Road
 600 Rosemont/Schaumburg Express (Monday-Saturday only)
 603 Elgin Transportation Center/Rosemont Express (Monday-Saturday only)
 605 I-90/Randall Road Park-n-Ride/Rosemont Express (Monday-Saturday only)
 606 Rosemont/Schaumburg Limited
 811 Rosemont Entertainment Circulator

Image gallery

Notes and references

Notes

References

External links

 Train schedule (PDF) at CTA official site
 Station from I-190 from Google Maps Street View

CTA Blue Line stations
Rosemont, Illinois
Railway stations in the United States opened in 1983
1983 establishments in Illinois